Serruria confragosa, the wavy spiderhead, is a flower-bearing shrub that belongs to the genus Serruria and forms part of the fynbos. The plant is native to the Western Cape and occurs in the Koue Bokkeveld Mountains and Great Winterhoek Mountains. The shrub grows upright with few branches and grows 1.0 m tall, and flowers from September to November.

Fire destroys the plant but the seeds survive. Two months after flowering, the fruit falls off and ants disperse the seeds. They store the seeds in their nests. The plant is unisexual. Pollination takes place through the action of insects. The plant grows on dry, sandstone soils at altitudes of 1000 to 1250 m.

References

External links
 Threatened Species Programme | SANBI Red List of South African Plants
 Serruria confragosa (Wavy spiderhead)
 Stalked Spiderheads

confragosa
Flora of South Africa